Eleutherodactylus warreni is a species of frogs in the family Eleutherodactylidae. It is endemic to the island of Tortuga off the northwestern coast of Haiti. Its natural habitat is xeric hardwood forest at an elevation of about  asl. It is a terrestrial frog occurring on rocks and in leaf litter. It is threatened by habitat loss caused by logging and agriculture.

References

warreni
Frogs of Haiti
Endemic fauna of Haiti
Amphibians described in 1976
Taxonomy articles created by Polbot